Francesco Andrea Di Grazia (born 8 May 1996) is an Italian professional footballer who plays as a winger for  club Potenza.

Career
Coming through the youth teams and impressing at youth level during the 2014–2015 season scoring 17 goals in 28 games, he was promoted to the first team for the 2015–2016 season. At the age of 19, he was loaned out to Italian club Akragas. Di Grazia impressed in his first professional season whilst at the Sicilian club netting 4 goals and 2 assists in 16 games despite the majority of his playing time coming from the bench. In the 2016–2017 season, Di Grazia established himself as a regular for Catania and as one of the hottest prospects in the lower leagues of Italian football. He repaid the faith shown in him by the team by contributing 8 goals and 4 assists in 32 games.

In 2019 he joined Pescara.

On 13 January 2021 he went to Arezzo on loan.

On 31 August 2021 he joined Foggia on a new loan.

References

External links
 

1996 births
Living people
Footballers from Sicily
Italian footballers
Association football midfielders
Serie B players
Serie C players
Catania S.S.D. players
S.S. Akragas Città dei Templi players
Delfino Pescara 1936 players
S.S. Arezzo players
Calcio Foggia 1920 players
Potenza Calcio players